Orneta  (Prussian: Wurmedītin) is a town in northern Poland, with a total population of 8,951 (2016). It is situated in the Warmian-Masurian Voivodeship and within the historical region of Warmia.

History 

Wormditt, a village of Old Prussians, was first mentioned in 1308. The town coat of arms depicts the worm (English: worm, dragon), German: Worms, Wurm as in Tatzelwurm, Lindworm). The bishop of Warmia Eberhard von Neiße ordered the building of a city which received town rights in 1313 and was mainly populated by settlers from Silesia.

Until 1772 Orneta was part of Poland. In 1538 Orneta was visited by astronomer Nicolaus Copernicus, who accompanied the newly elected Warmian bishop,  Polish diplomat Jan Dantyszek during his tour of Warmia. The town was annexed by the Kingdom of Prussia in the First Partition of Poland, and subsequently it became part of Germany in 1871. The Germans established three prisoner of war forced labour camps in the town.

After World War II the town again became part of Poland, under territorial changes demanded by the Soviet Union at the Potsdam Conference.

In May 2010, a procession with the coffin of Nicolaus Copernicus stopped in Orneta and official ceremonies took place before the great astronomer was buried again in Frombork.

Legend of the dragon
According to some legend, many ages ago there lived a dragon that devoured not only animals, but also women and children. Many knights who tried to set the town free from the disaster were killed in a struggle with the monster. At last one of the knights managed to combat the dragon. Reminiscences of the legend are reflected in Orneta's crest. The oldest image of the crest is known from the sealing wax on the document from 1388. It represents the dragon biting its own tail. In the frame of the seal there is only a fragment of an inscription which says" S.BV.MDIT." However, on the seals from the 15th century, a juridical seal from the 16th century as well as the seal of the town secretary from 18th century there is the dragon coiled, lying on its own back.

Sports
It competes in the lower leagues.

Gallery

Notable residents
 Petrus Zwicker (died 1403), cleric
 Krzysztof Jotko (born 1989), mixed martial artist

References

External links

 Orneta's unofficial website
 Orneta's official website

Cities and towns in Warmian-Masurian Voivodeship
Lidzbark County